Acrosyntaxis angustipennis is a moth in the family Autostichidae. It was described by Rebel in 1927. It is found in Egypt.

References

Moths described in 1927
Acrosyntaxis